Gerzovo (Serbian Cyrillic:Герзово) is a settlement located in the municipality of Mrkonjić Grad, Bosnia and Herzegovina.

Geography 
Gerzovo is located in the southeastern portion of the Mrkonjić Grad Municipality bordering Šipovo. Gerzovo is situated under a hill and is primarily a field.

Name 
This settlement wasn't always named Gerzovo, in the 1528 Ottoman Defter it was labeled as Pr'ovo (Прхово) or Popovići. The Slavic traveler Benedikt Kuripešić concluded in his Book (Travel Writings through Bosnia, Serbia, Bulgaria, and Rumelia;1530) that the settlement's name was Gerzovo. In correlation with Atanastije Grgićević in the description of the Klis Sanjak mentions Sokograd and Gerzovo together. Gerzovo itself is derived from the Duke Gerzelez Alija (Turkish: Gürz Ilyas) whose turbe until recently was located in Gerzovo, on Breščić, and who died there at the end of the 15th century.

History 
In late May 1463, Mahmud Pasha launched an invasion of Bosnia with 20,000 Soldiers directly heading towards Jajce through Gerzovo, Sokoc, Pecka, Medina, and Ključ. After the Turkish Conquest of Bosnia, The Nahija of Sokol or The Nahija of Gerzovo was a Nahija formed in 1528 that controlled territory from Pliva to the Sana river. During this time period, the settlement of Pecka and Vrbljani was first mentioned. In the Turkish defters, it is hard to identify the correlation between censuses in that period to now due to name changes. The settlement Gerzovo was named  Prhovo (Прово) while the settlement Pecka was listed as Kozara (Козара). It can be confirmed that all of the settlements around Baraći were part of the Sokolac Nahija. During the Nahija of Gerzovo, Sokograd was the administrative center of the Nahija.

Nahija of Gerzovo

Toponyms 
In the Župa of Gerzovo, Many settlements were inhabited during the Roman Empire. Pecka was (Sarnade) Sarići was (Saritte near Šipovo) Jezero was (Indenea) and Majdan or Mrkonjić was (Balole)

Demographics

References

Clarifications

Notes

Sources 

 
 
 

Geography of Bosnia and Herzegovina